Barring may refer to:

 Barring (music), a guitar playing technique
 Barring engine, forms part of the installation of a large stationary steam engine
 Barring order, an order used by a court to protect a person, object, business, company, state, country, establishment, or entity, and the general public, in a situation involving alleged domestic violence, child abuse, assault, harassment, stalking, or sexual assault.

See also
 Bar (disambiguation)
 Banning